Ronald Terry Burr (born September 30, 1964) is an American Internet and media entrepreneur, based in Los Angeles, CA.   He is the holder of nine internet patents and the co-founder and original chief executive officer of NetZero.   During his career he has created over $1 Billion in value for shareholders. Early in his career Burr developed software applications which are used by IBM, Verizon Wireless, and Sempra Energy.  Burr is often a guest speaker at industry conferences  and was named by InfoWorld as one of  the Top 50 IT executives at xSP's, by Interactive Week as one of the 25 Top Unsung Hero's of the Net and was a finalist for Ernst & Young's Entrepreneur of the Year award. Burr was also the chief executive officer of online advertising company WebVisible, Inc. until its closure in 2011 due to unpaid debts.

Biography

Early life
In 1983, Burr landed a position at Vault Corporation, an early pioneer in the software industry and creators of the Prolok Disk (US patent 4,785,361). Burr eventually became Vice President of Software Development.

Career
In 1989, Burr was recruited as a senior technology consultant for IBM's OS/2.  In 1992, Burr co-founded Impact Software, with Stacy Haitsuka, Harold McKenzie and Marwan Zebian, an international IT consulting firm.  In 1998 they sold Impact Software to another IT Consulting firm.

In 1997, Burr co-founded NetZero, with Stacy Haitsuka, Harold McKenzie and Marwan Zebian.  In 1998, NetZero received initial venture capital from idealab and Bill Gross and later Draper Fisher Jurvetson and Compaq.  An industry pioneer, Burr managed NetZero through its early growth to its dominant position as one of the world's largest Internet Service Providers.  Burr holds nine Internet technology patents in the areas of online advertising and market research.  NetZero went public in Sept of 1999 and now trades under the symbol.  Interactive Week named him one of the “25 Top Unsung Heroes of the Net”, InfoWorld named him in the “Top 50 IT executives at xSP’s” and he is on Response Magazine's list of the “21 people leading us into the 21st Century.”

In 2001, Burr co-founded Westlake Venture Partners with Stacy Haitsuka, Harold MacKenzie and Marwan Zebian 
.  Westlake Venture Partners invests in emerging companies providing both hands-on management and capital investments. Through Westlake Venture Partners, Burr has served in operational and advisory roles for various companies including of Layer 2 Networks, and Jambo, a leading pay-per call internet company targeting local business.  As of 2010, Westlake Venture Partners has funded over 15 companies 5 with successful exits, one pending and two on the horizon.

In 2009, Burr became Chief Operations Officer for WebVisible, a Software as a Service (SaaS) company based in Southern California.  In 2010, Burr became the chief executive officer for WebVisible. He held this position until December 27, 2011, when he sent a note to his employees stating the company was to close due to unpaid debts.

See also
NetZero
United Online

References

External links
 Entrepreneur Spotlight: Ronald Burr
  "United Online"
 "Keiretsu News - Member Profile"
  "ISP-Planet - Business - NetZero Founder Move Into The Fast Lane"
 NetZero Receives VC Endorsement
 NetZero Co-Founder Launches Net to Phone Startup
 Westlake Venture Partners invests in emerging companies
 Calling Plan - Forbes.com

1964 births
Living people
American computer businesspeople